The 1905 Canadian Amateur Hockey League (CAHL) season was the seventh and final season of the league. Teams played a ten-game schedule. This year saw the addition of two teams, Montreal Westmount and Montreal Nationals. Montreal Nationals had previously been in the FAHL. Montreal Victorias won the league championship with a record of 9–1.

League business

Executive 
 Fred McRobie, Victorias (President)
 Harry Shaw, Montreal (Secretary-Treasurer)

At the league meeting, new franchises were granted to Montreal Westmount and Montreal Le National. Grand Trunk, Three Rivers and Montreal Wanderers were turned down. Ottawa representative J.P. Dickson attended the meeting to try to arrange a return to the league by Ottawa on condition that Wanderers were accepted also. This was turned down, partly because the league had decided to have exclusively amateur players.

Pre-season
Quebec Hockey Club went to New York City in December 1904 for an exhibition series against tha amateur teams of New York at St. Nicholas Rink. Quebec lost to New York Wanderers 5-3 and defeated the New York Athletic Club 7-2.

Regular season

Highlights 
Montreal Hockey Club's captain, Archie Hooper died before the season of complications stemming from a February 1903 ice hockey game injury.

This season saw several impressive rookies including Art Ross for Montreal Westmount and Ernie Russell for Montreal. Lester and Frank Patrick played together for Montreal Westmount.

The league had a lot of scoring. The league leader, Russell Bowie of Victorias scored 27 goals in eight games. On January 7, Shamrocks and Westmount combined for 24 goals in a Shamrocks 14–10 win. On February 18, Fred Brophy, the Westmount goaltender, decided to get in on the act and rushed the length of the ice to score against Paddy Moran of Quebec.

Montreal Le National lost their first four games by a combined score of 6–42 and withdrew from the rest of the schedule, defaulting the rest of their matches.

Montreal Victorias won the season with a record of 9–1, but could not make a satisfactory arrangement with the Stanley Cup trustees and would not play in a challenge against Ottawa. The Victorias were granted a best-of-three series by the trustees, but declined, demanding a sudden-death game or two-game, total-goals series, which was not agreed to by the trustees.

Final standing 

† Le National defaulted their last six games.

Schedule and results 

† Defaulted by Nationals

†† Victorias clinch league championship.

Player statistics

Goaltending averages

Scoring leaders

See also 
 1904–05 FAHL season
 Canadian Amateur Hockey League
 List of pre-NHL seasons
 List of ice hockey leagues

References 
 
Notes

1904
CAHL